Charn is a fictional city appearing in the 1955 book The Magician's Nephew, the sixth book published in C. S. Lewis's Chronicles of Narnia, written as a prequel to The Lion, the Witch, and the Wardrobe.   Charn, and the world of which it is the capital city, are the birthplace of Jadis, also known as the White Witch, who later seizes control of Narnia.  

When visited briefly by Digory and Polly, the protagonists of the novel, the city is totally deserted, lifeless, and crumbling under a dying sun. Although according to Jadis the sun had been that way for eons, likely predating the dynasty, the city, and the civilization of the world itself. Rivers have dried up, and neither weeds nor insects live.  All life in the world of Charn had been destroyed by Jadis through an evil magic spell known as the Deplorable Word. In the novel, the city stands as an example of the dead end that can result if a civilization succumbs to evil.

During their visit, Digory accidentally wakes Jadis from suspended animation, and she is able to leave the world with them.

History
According to Jadis, Charn was once the greatest city of her unnamed world, "the wonder of the world, perhaps of all worlds." It was a magnificent civilization ruled by a line of magically adept emperors and empresses, of whom Jadis was the last. However, by the time the protagonists enter, the world is now a cold and desolate wasteland with no life to be seen anywhere, and the city is on the brink of collapse.

Magic may have been widely used in Charn; Jadis referred to the common use of magic carpets for transportation. Their use was apparently limited to the nobility, who inherited inborn magical powers. Jadis disdained Andrew Ketterley, Digory's magician uncle, as a petty conjurer without a drop of real magic blood in his veins, saying, "Your kind was made an end of in my world a thousand years ago."

Apparently dragons were also once abundant in Charn and in the service of the royal and noble families.

The Hall of Images in the royal palace exhibits lifelike images of the past rulers of Charn, all remarkably tall and beautiful, and all crowned and seated upon thrones. The sequence of these images, through the expressions on their faces, tells a story of a civilization that was once benevolent but degenerated into a cruel, tyrannical empire. The early Emperors and Empresses of Charn were kind and decent, but through the passage of the centuries, and for unexplained reasons their lineage devolved into one of malevolence, corruption, evil, and despair, seeing their subjects only as a means to an end. Evidently, their hunger for power was insatiable and they conquered several other realms, as Jadis gloats that "many great kings" attempted to stand against Charn, but were defeated and their names lost to history. Slavery was once common in Charn, as was human sacrifice. The last queen of Charn was Jadis, although the numerous empty thrones after hers suggest a premature end to the dynasty.

As Jadis leads the children through the decaying palace, she describes the cruelty of Charn and its leaders. She points out dungeons and torture chambers to them and recounts that her great-grandfather once invited seven hundred nobles to a banquet and slaughtered them all, "before they had drunk their fill," for "they had rebellious thoughts."

When the children finally see the full extent of the city from the balcony of the royal palace, it extends as far as the eye can see in any direction, as if covering the entire world. It is described as being full of pyramids, bridges, palaces, and towers with a great river that had once run through it that has since turned to dust.  Jadis recalls viewing the city while it was full of life, quoting: "It is silent now. But I have stood here when the whole air was full of the noises of Charn; the trampling of feet, the creaking of wheels, the cracking of the whips and the groaning of slaves, the thunder of chariots, and the sacrificial drums beating in the temples. I have stood here (but that was near the end) when the roar of battle went up from every street and the river of Charn ran red."

The destruction of Charn
Jadis was responsible for the eradication of all life on Charn but blamed the destruction on her sister. Jadis and her sister fought a civil war for the throne, which Jadis eventually lost. She claimed she had offered to spare her sister's life if she surrendered, so the resulting destruction was the unnamed sister's fault. Jadis obliterated her kingdom and all its people rather than relinquishing her power over them.

According to Jadis's own account, her sister had started a long and murderous civil war.  There was a solemn oath between her and the unnamed sister that neither side would use magic, a pact broken by the sister, who gained the advantage as a result. Jadis recounts that during the civil war, she "poured out the blood of her armies like water," but was eventually defeated.  In the final battle, which was fought in the city itself over three days, the sister defeated the last of Jadis' forces.

Within the ruling family of Charn, there was knowledge of an evil spell, the Deplorable Word, which would destroy all life except the one who spoke it, though the word itself was a mystery. Although her ancestors had bound themselves and their descendants with oaths never to seek knowledge of this spell, Jadis had sought it out and learned the word "in a secret place and paid a terrible price to learn it."  Her sister knew Jadis had discovered the Deplorable Word but did not think Jadis would use it. Facing defeat, Jadis spoke the Deplorable Word, which annihilated all life under the sun apart from herself.

After this, she put herself into an enchanted sleep in the Hall of Images. During her suspended animation, all water in Charn dried up and the once-magnificent city crumbled into ruin.

The waking of Jadis
The spell that bound Jadis was broken by Digory Kirke. He and Polly Plummer had arrived on Charn via the Wood between the Worlds, and they had explored the deserted royal palace. In the room where Jadis slumbered with life-sized images of her royal ancestors, Kirke succumbed to temptation after having read a verse:

Make your choice, adventurous Stranger;Strike the bell and bide the danger,Or wonder, till it drives you mad,What would have followed if you had.

Charn's star is described as red, large, and cold.  When Digory asks Jadis about the star's appearance, she asks him about his world's Sun. When informed that the Sun is yellow, brighter, smaller, and "gives off a good deal more heat," she remarks with sudden interest, "Ah, so yours is a younger world."

Charn and the realm in which it resided ceased to exist entirely after Jadis and the children left.  Later, when Aslan and the children are in the Wood between the Worlds, Aslan shows them that the puddle leading to Charn is dried up, as the empty world has been destroyed.  Jadis entered Narnia with the humans from Earth, and 900 years later appears as the White Witch in The Lion, the Witch and the Wardrobe, ruling that land for 100 years until Aslan returned and defeated her with the aid of the four Pevensie children.

Commentary
The name "Charn" suggests "charnel house," a repository for human skeletal remains. The hall of the figures of the rulers of Charn, inspired by the underground grotto of mummies in King Solomon's Mines, shows a progression illustrating the decline and fall of the city and its world, reflecting a view of history described by G. K. Chesterton. The "deplorable word" is most likely a metaphor for weapons of mass destruction, which many feared would bring about the destruction of the world at the time when the novel was written.

In the last chapter of the book, Polly asks Aslan if humanity has yet grown as corrupt as Charn, to which he replies:

In this paragraph Lewis may have been stating about the start of tyranny, despotism, and corruption, including Communism spreading abroad. The part where Aslan states that before they become an old man or woman their world, which is our world "will be ruled by tyrants who care no more for joy and justice and mercy than Empress Jadis". This might be indicating World War I and World War II because as in The Lion, the Witch and the Wardrobe happened in the World War II states Digory as Professor Kirke and as an old man.

References

Fictional elements introduced in 1955
+
Fictional populated places
Fictional empires

pl:Miejsca w cyklu Opowieści z Narnii#C